Dactylocalycidae is a family of sponges belonging to the order Lychniscosida.

Genera:
 Dactylocalyx Stutchbury, 1841
 Exanthesis Regnard, 1925
 Iphiteon Bowerbank, 1869
 Moretiella Breistroffer, 1949
 Ophrystoma Zittel, 1878
 Paraplocia Pomel, 1872

References

Sponges